Kristóf Polyák (born 28 September 1995 in Kecskemét) is a Hungarian football player who currently plays for Ceglédi VSE.

Club statistics

Updated to games played as of 15 October 2014.

References 

1995 births
Living people
People from Kecskemét
Hungarian footballers
Association football defenders
Budapest Honvéd FC players
Kecskeméti TE players
Szigetszentmiklósi TK footballers
Ceglédi VSE footballers
Tiszakécske FC footballers
Nemzeti Bajnokság I players
Nemzeti Bajnokság II players
Sportspeople from Bács-Kiskun County